Zero-2-One Tower will be a  residential building in Cape Town, South Africa. It is currently in the planning stages of development by FWJK and upon completion will have 624 apartments, 760 parking bays and 6,000 m2 of retail space. Once completed it will be the tallest building in Cape Town.

Affordable housing 
Public housing advocacy group Ndifuna Ukwazi disputed the building's design arguing that no allowance for affordable housing had been made in the original plans which was problematic given South Africa's housing shortage.  In August  2017 FWJK stated that 104 of the building's apartments would be made available for affordable housing each retailing at under R800,000 which Ndifuna Ukwazi argued was too expensive for the majority of Captonians.  Approval for the building was granted in 2018 by the City of Cape Town after it was agreed that 20 percent (240 apartments) of the residential units would be reserved for affordable housing.  The building developer FWJK appealed the ruling for the affordable housing reservation.

References

Buildings and structures in Cape Town
Skyscrapers in Cape Town